The Little Murray River, an anabranch of the Murray River and part of the Murray–Darling basin, is located in the Mallee district of north western Victoria, in eastern Australia.

Location and features
The anabranch leaves the Murray River near Fish Point and flows generally northwest in a highly meandering course, joined by the Loddon River, before it rejoins the Murray near Swan Hill, descending  over its  course. Little Murray River and the Murray River enclose Pental Island.

The traditional custodians of the land surrounding Little Murray River, the Aboriginal people of the Wemba-Wemba clan, called the river Parnimilli, meaning "little river". It is also known as the Marraboor River.

Two bridges cross the river to Pental Island, at Swan Hill in the west, and on Fish Point Road at Fish Point in the east.

See also

References

North-Central catchment
Rivers of Loddon Mallee (region)
Mallee (Victoria)
Tributaries of the Murray River